Alex Greenwood (born 1993) is an English women's professional footballer.

Alex Greenwood may also refer to:
 Alex Greenwood (footballer, born 1933), English footballer

See also 
 Al Greenwood (born 1951), U.S. rock musician
 Greenwood (surname)
 Greenwood (disambiguation)
 Alex (disambiguation)